The Candelaria Caves are a large natural cave system in the highland-lowland transition of Alta Verapaz in Guatemala between the municipalities of Chisec and Raxruha. The caves are famous for their peculiar karst phenomena and significance to Mayan history.

Geology 
Amongst the attractions of their huge karst caverns are speleothems like stalactites, stalagmites, stalagnates and flowstone drapes. Pit caves, caused by collapse of the ceiling, light the inside of the caves. The main gallery has a length of 22 km, of which 12.5 km follows the underground passage of the Candelaria River.  The total length of the cave system, including coulisses, secondary and upper passages, is estimated to be 80 km.

History 
The Great Western Trade Route  of the Classic Maya, which connected the Guatemalan highlands to the Petén lowlands, went through the Candelaria Caves area. Pottery artefacts and rupestral paintings evidence the use of the caves for ceremonies.  The Popol Vuh of the K'iche' people considers the Candelaria Caves an entrance to the underworld. Some of the caves are still used for Mayan celebrations. Even though, the caves now are opened to the public.

Administration 
The government of Guatemala declared the Candelaria Caves national park in 1999. After long battles with the government the local Q'eqchi' people gained the management of tourism in the caves through their “Association Maya Q'eqchi Development and Tourism of Candelaria-Camposanto”. There are several entrances to the caves, managed by different Q'eqchi' communities like the association Bombilpek El Porvenir. They charge a small fee to visit the caves with a guide and use this fund to support the economic life of the village in the most equitable way possible.

References

Bibliography

Caves of Guatemala
Limestone caves
Wild caves